Desolation is a 2018 American thriller film written by Matthew McCarty and Craig Walendziak, directed by David Moscow and starring Dominik García-Lorido, Brock Kelly and Raymond J. Barry.

Cast
Dominik García-Lorido as Katie
Brock Kelly as Jay
Raymond J. Barry as Father Bill
Ninja N. Devoe as Debbie

Release
The film was released theatrically in New York City and Los Angeles on January 26, 2018.

Reception
The film has a 44% rating on Rotten Tomatoes based on nine reviews.

Joe Leydon of Variety gave the film a negative review and wrote, "A potentially intriguing premise gets a maladroit execution in a thriller that's more befuddling than exciting."

Kimber Myers of the Los Angeles Times also gave the film a negative review and wrote, "It wants to be a commentary on the depravity of Hollywood and what people find entertaining, but instead it mostly just mirrors the media’s habit of using sexual trauma as a plot device and surviving such horrors as a character trait."

Norman Gidney of Film Threat awarded the film two stars and wrote, "If Desolation had just assumed that its audience needed less explanation while doling out the mystery, this could have been a savvy update. Instead, the film just comes off as contrived."

Dax Ebaben of Bloody Disgusting awarded the film two and a half skulls out of five and wrote, "In all, Desolation is not a bad film, it’s simply middle-of-the-road. Respectably, the film has something to say and makes no bones about it."

References

External links
 
 

American thriller films